Pelican Cays Land and Sea Park is a national park in Central Abaco, the Abaco Islands, the Bahamas. The park's marine environment contains an extensive coral reef and undersea cave habitat, which provide opportunities for snorkelling and underwater diving.

Flora and fauna
Over 170 species of plants and animals have been documented within the park's land and sea areas, including loggerhead and green sea turtles, bottlenose dolphins, and nesting bridled terns.

References

National parks of the Bahamas
Abaco Islands